Arrade is a genus of moths of the family Erebidae described by Francis Walker in 1863.

Description
Palpi obliquely porrect (extending forward), of moderate length. Second joint hairy. Frontal tuft sharp. Antennae minutely ciliated in male. Thorax and abdomen smoothly scaled. Abdomen long. Legs naked. Forewings long and narrow with acute apex. The outer margin nearly straight. A large tuft of scales found on inner margin beyond middle. Veins 6 and 7 arise from angle of cell. Veins 8 to 10 stalked from before the end or sometimes vein 10 absent. Hindwings with veins 3 and 4 stalked or from cell, whereas veins 6 and 7 stalked and vein 5 from middle of discocellulars.

Species
Arrade aroa (Bethune-Baker, 1908) New Guinea
Arrade cristatum (Hampson, 1893) Sri Lanka
Arrade destituta (Walker, 1865) Queensland
Arrade erebusalis Walker, 1863 Sri Lanka, Nicobar Islands, Singapore, Borneo, New Guinea, Bismarck Archipelago, Queensland
Arrade juba Schaus, 1913 Costa Rica
Arrade leucocosmalis (Walker, 1863) Queensland
Arrade lineatula (Walker, 1863) Borneo
Arrade linecites Schaus, 1916 Cuba
Arrade monaeses Schaus, 1913 Costa Rica
Arrade ostentalis (Walker, 1863) Borneo, Peninsular Malaysia, India, Philippines
Arrade parva Bethune-Baker, 1894 Egypt
Arrade percnopis Turner, 1908 Queensland
Arrade rudisella (Walker, 1863) Borneo, Sumatra, Sulawesi
Arrade samoensis Tams, 1935 Solomon Islands, Samoa
Arrade stenoptera (Bethune-Baker, 1911) Angola
Arrade vitellinalis (Walker, [1866]) Java

References

Hypeninae
Moth genera